Krajna is a forested historical region in Poland, situated in the border area between the Greater Poland, Kuyavian-Pomeranian and Pomeranian Voivodeships. The region consists of parts of Złotów, Piła, Sępólno, Nakło, Bydgoszcz and Człuchów counties, namely the urban gmina of Złotów, the rural gmina of Złotów and the urban-rural gminas of Krajenka, Wysoka, Wyrzysk, Łobżenica, Kamień Krajeński, Sępólno Krajeńskie, Więcbork, Nakło nad Notecią, Koronowo and Debzno.  The name of Krajna is derived from the Slavic word for borderland (between Greater Poland and Pomerania), cf. Krajina.

The main towns in the region are Złotów and Nakło nad Notecią. Since 1932, Krajna has own regional anthem, composed by Paweł "Krajnomir" Jasiek

Part of the region forms a protected area called Krajna Landscape Park.

References 

Forests of Poland
Regions of Poland